George Wells may refer to:

 George A. Wells (politician) (1910–1979), American politician
 George Albert Wells (1926–2017), professor of German at Birkbeck, University of London
 George H. Wells (1833–1905), American soldier, lawyer and Louisiana politician
 George Wells (bishop) (1877–1964), Anglican bishop in Canada
 George Wells (cricketer) (1830–1891), English cricketer
 George Wells (engineer) (fl.1860s), English marine engineer
 George Wells (Georgia politician) (1751–1834), acting governor of Georgia in 1780
 George Wells (Vanuatuan politician), Internal Affairs Minister of Vanuatu
 George Wells (screenwriter) (1909–2000), American screenwriter
 George Wells (wrestler) (born 1947), retired American professional wrestler
 George Wells Parker (1882–1931), African American political activist
 G. P. Wells (1901–1985), zoologist and author
 George B. Wells, American football coach in the United States
 George Crichton Wells (1914–1999), dermatologist
See also
 George Orson Welles, full name of Orson Welles
 George Wells Beadle (1903–1989), American scientist
 Wells (name)
 George (given name)
 Wells (disambiguation)
 Welles (disambiguation)
 Welles (name)